José Joaquín Santibáñez Andalon (born 3 April 1952 in Mexico City) is a Mexican former swimmer who competed in the 1968 Summer Olympics and in the 1972 Summer Olympics.

References

1952 births
Living people
Mexican male swimmers
Swimmers from Mexico City
Male backstroke swimmers
Male medley swimmers
Olympic swimmers of Mexico
Swimmers at the 1968 Summer Olympics
Swimmers at the 1972 Summer Olympics
Central American and Caribbean Games gold medalists for Mexico
Competitors at the 1970 Central American and Caribbean Games
Central American and Caribbean Games medalists in swimming
20th-century Mexican people